Wable-Augustine Tavern is a historic inn and tavern located near Addison in Addison Township in Somerset County, Pennsylvania. It was built about 1820, and is a 2 1/2-story, five bay, Federal period frame building.  It sits on a rubblestone foundation and features interior stone gable end chimneys.  The house operated as an inn and tavern during the National Road boom period; from the 1820s to the 1850s.

It was listed on the National Register of Historic Places in 1995.

References 

Hotel buildings on the National Register of Historic Places in Pennsylvania
Federal architecture in Pennsylvania
Commercial buildings completed in 1820
Buildings and structures in Somerset County, Pennsylvania
National Register of Historic Places in Somerset County, Pennsylvania